Apache MINA (Multipurpose Infrastructure for Network Applications) is an open source Java network application framework. MINA can be used to create scalable, high performance network applications. MINA provides unified APIs for various transports like TCP, UDP, serial communication. It also makes it easy to make an implementation of custom transport type. MINA provides both high-level and low-level network APIs.

A user application interacts with MINA APIs, shielding the user application from low level I/O details. MINA internally uses I/O APIs to perform the actual I/O functions. This makes it easy for the users to concentrate on the application logic and leave the I/O handling to Apache MINA.

Advantages
Unified APIs for various transports (TCP/UDP etc.)
Provides high/low level APIs
Customizable Thread Model
Easy Unit Testing using Mock Objects
Integration with DI frameworks like Spring, Google Guice, picocontainer
JMX Manageability

Tooling
Graphical tools such as Eclipse IDE, IntelliJ IDEA can be used.

Alternatives
Grizzly
Netty 4
QuickServer
xSocket

See also

Application server
Apache Camel
Enterprise messaging system
Message-oriented middleware
Service-oriented architecture
Event-driven SOA

References

External links

MINA
Java platform
Message-oriented middleware